The No. 2 New Zealand General Hospital was a World War I military hospital in Walton-on-Thames, England. The hospital opened in 1915 by requisitioning the essentially 15th century Mount Felix estate, a grand house with gardens, and closed in 1920. 

It was the first hospital in the United Kingdom used specifically for soldiers of the New Zealand Expeditionary Force. In 1916 a new hospital was built in Brockenhurst, Hampshire, as the No. 1 New Zealand General Hospital, and Mount Felix was renamed as the number two hospital. Approximately 27,000 New Zealand soldiers were treated at the hospital during the war. The hospital was memorialised by the Mount Felix Tapestry which toured New Zealand in 2018 and the next year.

The buildings were demolished in 1967 to leave the clock tower and stable block – grade II listed buildings – which is by far the most abundant category of statutory protection and recognition.

The first matron of the hospital was Mabel Thurston who later became matron-in-chief of the New Zealand Army Nursing Service.

'2 General Hospital' was a unit of the New Zealand Medical Corps. The unit was re-raised in World War II and served with the 2nd New Zealand Expeditionary Force in Egypt, the Western Desert, Tunisia, and Italy. The unit is now called '2 (General Hospital) Field Hospital'.

Site
The site four decades before the requisitioning was drawn by government survey as shown. The gardens to north (river) and south and east (road) came with these buildings.

See also
Henry Percy Pickerill, a dental surgeon posted to the hospital
No. 1 New Zealand General Hospital

References

Further reading 

 Remembering the New Zealanders in Walton-on-Thames, New Zealand Women's Association and New Zealand High Commission, London.

External links 
 The Mount Felix Tapestry homepage
 
 

Military units and formations of the New Zealand Army
Military hospitals in the United Kingdom
Army medical units and formations
Defunct hospitals in England
Hospitals disestablished in 1920
Hospitals established in 1915